Rocchetta Ligure is a comune (municipality) in the Province of Alessandria in the Italian region Piedmont, located about  southeast of Turin and about  southeast of Alessandria.

The municipality of Rocchetta Ligure contains the frazioni (subdivisions, mainly villages and hamlets) Bregni Inferiore, Bregni Superiore, Celio, Pagliaro Inferiore, Pagliaro Superiore, Piani di Celio, Sant'Ambrogio, and Sisola.

Rocchetta Ligure borders the following municipalities: Albera Ligure, Cabella Ligure, Cantalupo Ligure, Mongiardino Ligure, and Roccaforte Ligure.

Demographic evolution

References

Cities and towns in Piedmont

lij:A Rocheta